Lisa Helfend Meyer (born October 11, 1957) is an American attorney who is known for her celebrity clients.

She has represented many clients, including Trevor Bauer's alleged victim, Paul Nassif, Anna Anka, Kelly Rutherford, Brody Dalle, Dr. Dre's ex-wife Nicole Young, Cesar Millan's ex-wife Ilusión Millán, Kelly Clarkson's ex-husband Brandon Blackstock., Tom Barrack's ex-wife Laurel Barrack, Tony Danza's ex-wife Tracy Danza, Lisa Bonder, Christina Ricci, Chrishell Stause, Evan Rachel Wood, Keenen Ivory Wayans, Victoria Azarenka, Nancy Cartwright, Bebe Neuwirth, Paul Haggis, Jason Lee, Steve Lukather, Carl Karcher, Sebastien Izambard, Donna D'Errico, and Kenya Barris.

Meyer initially gained national recognition after successfully representing a woman who suffered severe brain damage during the birth of her triplets and was granted visitation rights to see them.

Early life and education 
Meyer graduated from Loyola Law School and received her Bachelor of Arts Degree in Communications Studies from the University of California, Los Angeles. Meyer was a member of Phi Delta Phi, the national legal honor fraternity.

Meyer is the eldest of three sisters. Meyer aspired to be an actress at a young age. During a college summer internship in a local TV newsroom, Meyer was subjected to a chauvinistic work culture.

Career 
In 2000, Meyer became a founding partner at Meyer, Olson, Lowy & Meyers, LLP (MOLM).

She specializes in family law, including marital separation, grey divorce, child custody litigation, prenuptial/postnuptial agreements, child custody move-away cases, division of estates, parental alienation and estrangement custody cases, child visitation disputes, contested adoptions, domestic violence, and dissolution of domestic partnerships.

Personal life 
Meyer's first marriage ended in divorce. She is now married to Ron Cherney, a dentist and avid golfer. Their primary residence is in Encino, Los Angeles at W. C. Fields's former home. Meyer has one daughter, Megan, and one son, Eric.

Awards and honors 
Meyer is a contributor to the Huffington Post Divorce blog. She was a consultant to the TV show Family Law and has been quoted as a legal expert by Associated Press, Los Angeles Times, Today Show, CNN, Court TV, Fox News, and CSQ Magazine.

See also 
 Laura Wasser
 Raoul Felder

References

External links 
 

Living people
Lawyers from Los Angeles
20th-century American lawyers
21st-century American lawyers
20th-century American women lawyers
21st-century American women lawyers
1957 births